24 images is a French-language film magazine published in Montreal, Quebec, Canada.

History and profile
Founded in 1979 by Benoît Patar, 24 images changed editors in 1987, with Marie-Claude Loiselle and Claude Racine assuming control. Loiselle and Racine improved the stature of the publication, adding such writers as Philippe Gajan, Gérard Grugeau, Thierry Horguelin, Gilles Marsolais and André Roy. It was published on a monthly basis. In May 2007, the magazine launched its weekly webzine.

See also
Ciné-Bulles
Séquences
  List of film periodicals

References

1979 establishments in Quebec
Canadian film websites
Cinema of Quebec
Film magazines published in Canada
French-language magazines published in Canada
French-language websites
Magazines established in 1979
Magazines published in Montreal
Monthly magazines published in Canada